Francis or Frank Brooke may refer to:
 Francis T. Brooke (1763–1851), politician from Virginia
 Francis Brooke (cricketer, born 1884) (1884–1960), English cricketer
 Francis Brooke (cricketer, born 1810) (1810—1886), English cricketer and British Army officer
 Francis Key Brooke (1852–1918), missionary bishop of what is now the Episcopal Diocese of Oklahoma
 Frank Brooke (1851–1920), Anglo-Irish Director of Great Southern and Eastern Railways and a member of the Earl of Ypres' Advisory Council

See also
Frances Brooke (1724–1789), English novelist, essayist, playwright and translator
Francis Gerard Brooks (1924–2010), Irish bishop